Elophila minoralis is a species of moth of the family Crambidae that is found in Madagascar.

References

Acentropinae
Moths described in 1881
Moths of Madagascar
Moths of Africa